Paleoceras is a genus of fossil cephalopods  from the Upper Cambrian.

References

Prehistoric nautiloid genera
Ellesmerocerida